The 1927 New South Wales Rugby Football League premiership was the twentieth season of Sydney's top-level rugby league club competition, Australia's first. Nine teams from across the city contested during the season, which culminated in South Sydney's victory over St. George in the premiership final.

Season summary
The 1927 season saw a new record for length of a player's suspension. Balmain's Bill Maizey was suspended for twelve months for punching Easts player George Clamback. The season was also the last as a player in the NSWRFL for future Australian Rugby League Hall of Fame inductee, Frank Burge, who had returned as captain-coach of St. George after three seasons out of the NSWRFL.

Teams
 Balmain, formed on 23 January 1908 at Balmain Town Hall
 Eastern Suburbs, formed on 24 January 1908 at Paddington Town Hall
 Glebe, formed on 9 January 1908
 Newtown, formed on 14 January 1908
 North Sydney, formed on 7 February 1908
 South Sydney, formed on January 17, 1908, at Redfern Town Hall
 St. George, formed on November 8, 1920, at Kogarah School of Arts
 Western Suburbs, formed on February 4, 1908
 University, formed in 1919 at Sydney University

Ladder

Finals
All four finalists had been decided before the end of the final round and by coincidence faced each other in the penultimate round. 1926 wooden spooners St. George had a massive turnaround in 1927, with a chance to become minor premiers in the final round when they played South Sydney who were just one point ahead of them on the ladder. However looking for their third successive title, South Sydney prevailed 22-9 in front of a large crowd of 26,649 at the Sydney Cricket Ground, and as a result took the minor premiership. On the same day, Western Suburbs and Eastern Suburbs played each other for third spot, with Western Suburbs winning 8-6.

In the semi-finals, both South Sydney and St. George overcame their opponents and were able to set up a rematch of their Round 18 game just two weeks earlier.

Final

Playing on a quagmire at the Royal Agricultural Society Grounds in front of a modest crowd of 12,124 St. George contested their first ever premiership decider in their seventh year in the top league. They confronted the might of South Sydney who were reigning premiers in the two prior years and minor premiers at the end of the 1927 regular season.

The two teams had already met earlier in the season at the Sydney Cricket Ground when Souths defeated Saints 17–14 in front of a massive crowd of 31,500. With heavy rain falling throughout the match, refereed by former Rabbitoh and international Webby Neill Souths took a 13–6 lead to the half time break. The Rabbitohs won the decider scoring four tries to three to take their third successive premiership and becoming the third club to do so.

South Sydney 20 (Tries: Carr, Root, Wearing, Finch. Goals: Blair 2, Kadwell 2)

defeated

St George 11 (Tries: Justice, Carstairs, Saunders. Goal: Saunders )

References

External links
 Rugby League Tables - Notes AFL Tables
 Rugby League Tables - Season 1927 AFL Tables
 Premiership History and Statistics RL1908
 Results: 1921-30 at rabbitohs.com.au

New South Wales Rugby League premiership
Nswrfl season